Don Turner  is a boxing trainer.

Biography
He is well known for his work with Evander Holyfield during the late 1990s, specifically during Holyfield's two wins over Mike Tyson. He was also at Holyfield's side when he fought Lennox Lewis. Turner worked with Heavyweight contender Michael Grant and most recently with rising prospect John Duddy. Don Turner has worked with or trained more than 20 world boxing champions and countless top ranked contenders.

Cutman Incident
He is credited as being the man who convinced Evander Holyfield that the cutman is "the biggest scam in boxing."  During the heavyweight championship bout, Holyfield suffered a cut above his left eye which kept reopening during the match, affecting his vision.  The lack of a cutman is thought to have been a determining factor that cost Holyfield the match.

References

Living people
American boxing trainers
Year of birth missing (living people)